"We Gotta Get You a Woman" is a 1970 song originally performed and written by Todd Rundgren from the 1970 album Runt.

Background
"We Gotta Get You a Woman" was inspired by Rundgren's friend, music executive Paul Fishkin, who later promoted the song and Rundgren. It refers to the two's "post-hanging days" in Greenwich Village. In the song, Rundgren tells his friend Leroy, “We gotta get you a woman / It’s like nothin’ else to make you feel sure you’re alive.” Robert Rodi thought the song was "ridiculously catchy" but criticized its depiction of women. Rundgren explained that the line "They may be stupid but they sure are fun" was widely misunderstood as a misogynistic comment about women, claiming that it was, rather, referring to "stupid little characteristics that people have—funny little quirks and stuff like that."

Chart performance
"We Gotta Get You a Woman" was Rundgren's first hit, reaching No. 20 on the U.S. Hot 100.
However, despite the success, he rarely performed the song in concert. Rundgren did perform the song during most concerts of his 2019 "Individualist" tour.

Cover versions
In 1971, New Zealand band Freedom Express released their version.
The Four Tops did a cover of this song in 1972 and included it on their Nature Planned It LP.

References

1970 songs
Todd Rundgren songs
1970 debut singles